Yin Zheng (born 30 December 1986) is a Chinese actor. He is known for his roles in Love Me, If You Dare, Goodbye Mr. Loser, Sparrow, Original Sin and Winter Begonia.

Filmography

Film

Television series

Variety show

Discography

Awards and nominations

References 

1986 births
Living people
Xinghai Conservatory of Music alumni
Male actors from Inner Mongolia
21st-century Chinese male actors
Chinese male television actors
Chinese male film actors